Kenneth Roy Thomason  (born 14 December 1944) is a former British Conservative Party politician. He was a local government leader and served one term as a member of parliament.

Local government experience
Thomason was educated at Cheney School in Oxford and trained as a Solicitor at the College of Law, being admitted to the Roll of Solicitors in 1969. He practised in Bournemouth and was elected to Bournemouth Council in 1970. From 1974 to 1982 he was the Leader of the Council, and he was made a delegate to the Council of the Association of District Councils in 1979. Thomason was made Chairman of the Conservative Party's Local Government Advisory Committee in 1980 and became Leader of the Conservative Group on the Association of District Councils the next year, serving until 1984 and 1987 respectively. In 1986 he was made an Officer of the Order of the British Empire for services to local government.

Parliament
Thomason contested Newport East in 1983, coming second to Labour's Roy Hughes by 2,630 votes.

Between 1988 and 1991 Thomason served on the National Union of Conservative and Unionist Associations Executive, a Conservative body which administered the party. He was selected to follow Sir Hal Miller as candidate for the safe seat of Bromsgrove, and won the seat with a 13,702 majority in the 1992 election. Thomason was one of 26 new Conservative MPs to sign an Early Day Motion put down by Eurosceptics calling for a "fresh start" in Britain's negotiations with the European Communities, but was not a hardened eurosceptic and signed an open letter calling for support for the 'paving motion' on the Maastricht Treaty in November 1992.

On social issues Thomason was mildly progressive, supporting a reduction in the age of consent for gay sex to 18 rather than equalising it with the heterosexual age at 16. He resigned from the Carlton Club in December 1994 at a time of a dispute over the admission of women, although newspapers suspected this was because he could not justify the cost of membership.

Decision to stand down
Thomason was censured by the House of Commons Select Committee on Standards and Privileges for failing to declare loans made to him. He decided not to re-stand after the local Conservative Association opened nominations to other candidates.

On 18 September 1996, Thomason decided he would not offer himself as a candidate for reselection and would stand down as an MP.

Subsequent career
After the 1997 election, Thomason went back into business management and is currently executive chairman of the Charminster group of property companies. He has also served as chairman of London Strategic Housing, a Housing Association.

References

External links 
 
 Court judgment of 2005 relating to Thomason's financial difficulties
 Tufnol Composites

1944 births
Councillors in South West England
Conservative Party (UK) MPs for English constituencies
British businesspeople
Living people
UK MPs 1992–1997
Officers of the Order of the British Empire
Politics of Worcestershire
People educated at Cheney School